Peder Jørgen Cloumann (14 April 1747 – 22 December 1817) was a Norwegian bailiff and politician.

Peder Jørgen Cloumann was born  at Strandebarm in  Hordaland, Norway where his father was the parish priest. He studied in the University of Copenhagen and achieved his Baccalaureate degree in 1763. In 1766, he went  to Bratsberg where he served as representative of the governor.

He was bailiff in Øvre Telemark from 1772 to 1811. He purchased the Moen farm in Kviteseid during 1783. He represented Bratsberg amt (now Telemark) at the Norwegian Constituent Assembly at Eidsvoll in 1814 where he belonged to the union party (Unionspartiet).

References

1747 births
1817 deaths
People from Hordaland
Fathers of the Constitution of Norway
Knights of the Order of the Dannebrog